Partido Acción Cristiana (PAC) (English: Christian Action Party) was formed in the 1960s to champion religious education in Puerto Rico and oppose the use of contraception, against Luis Muñoz Marín and the Popular Democratic Party.

Some of its main leaders were independentistas Jose Luis Feliu Pesquera and the brothers Juan Augusto Perea and Salvador Perea. Bishops James P. Davis of San Juan and James McManus of Ponce also favored the creation of the party. They told Catholics that voting for the PPD was counter to Christian morality. Nevertheless, their results were limited. 

According to Puerto Rican Senator-at-Large Hipólito Marcano, who testified before the U.S. Senate Education subcommittee which was then debating federal funding for parochial schools, the party was "used as a political weapon of the church to launch a frontal attack, not only to capture the public schools of Puerto Rico, but also to capture the government of Puerto Rico. The pulpit was turned into a political forum, the people were coerced and threatened with excommunication if they did not follow the political advice of the hierarchy."

The party is now defunct.

See also

Puerto Rican general election, 1960
Puerto Rican general election, 1964

References

External links
PUERTO RICO: Blow to the Bishops (Time, 16 November 1960)
Puerto Rico Encyclopedia: Davis, D. D. James P.
Historia de Puerto Rico: Cronología histórica 
Puerto Rico entre siglos: Historiografía y cultura 
Puerto Rico: Partido Acción Cristiana, 1960-62 
Surge un partido religioso 
 
 

Defunct political parties in Puerto Rico